Paleoworld (Season 2) is the second season of Paleoworld.

List of episodes (In original order)

Paleoworld